Bombay Priyudu is a 1996 Telugu-language romance film, starring J. D. Chakravarthy and Rambha. The film was dubbed in Tamil as Bombay Kadhali and in Hindi as Main Tere Pyar Mein Pagal.

Plot
Chitti Babu (J. D. Chakravarthy) and Pyarelal (Sudhakar) are roommates in Bombay. With photography as occupation, Chitti Babu is forever prowling the streets with his camera. One day when he comes to the airport to take pictures of a man, he spots Raga Sudha (Rambha) and falls in love with her at first sight. Bombay (Brahmanandam), who steals a gold chain from a jeweller's, drops it in Raga Sudha's bag while being chased by the police. The bag goes to Chitti Babu's gypsy, who finds his dream girl's photograph in it.

Chitti Babu dons the guise of a rich man and makes her come to different places to collect her bag, but does not give it. Chitti Babu meets her and tells her that he will help her in getting her bag. She falls for Chitti Babu.  Later, she finds that the bag is with Chitti Babu and accuses him of cheating her. In the process of appeasing his lady love, Chitti Babu meets with an accident and ends up in a hospital. This rekindles Raga Sudha's love for him.

Raga Sudha's mother, Dhana Lakshmi (Vanisri) returns from abroad with a prospective groom (Sivaji Raja) for her daughter. Coming to know of her daughter's love affair, she takes her away to Hyderabad and sets up a date for her wedding because Dhana Lakshmi's love is an anathema. Chitti Babu saves Dhana Lakshmi from goons sent by her manager (Benarjee). He is introduced himself as J. D. to Dhana Lakshmi. She appoints him as the bodyguard of Raga Sudha. The manager kidnaps Raga Sudha while they are going to  Srisailam for marriage by bus. Raga Sudha's maternal uncle Buchiki (A.V.S.) reveals that J. D. is none other than Chitti Babu. The manager wants to marry Raga Sudha and tries to rape her in the running bus. Chitti Babu fights Benarjee and marries Raga Sudha with the blessings of Dhana Lakshmi.

Cast
 J. D. Chakravarthy as Chitti Babu / J. D.
 Rambha as Raga Sudha
 Vanisri as Dhana Lakshmi
 M. Balaiah as Dhana Lakshmi's father
 Sudhakar as Pyarelal
 Brahmanandam as Bombay
 Tanikella Bharani as Kaima Patel
 A.V.S. as Buchiki
 Babu Mohan as P. K. Rao
 Sivaji Raja as P. K. Rao's son
 Chitti Babu Punyamurthula as singer
 Gundu Hanumantha Rao as Pandu
 Banerjee as Dhana Lakshmi's manager

Soundtrack

Reception 
A critic from Andhra Today wrote that "After a superhit like 'Pellisandadi' such a dull movie as this is not to the director's credit".

Awards
 Nandi Award for Best Female Playback Singer - K. S. Chitra - "Pranayama"

References

External links
 

1996 films
1990s Telugu-language films
Films scored by M. M. Keeravani
Films directed by K. Raghavendra Rao
Indian musical comedy films
Indian romantic comedy films
Indian romantic musical films
1990s musical comedy films
1996 romantic comedy films
1990s romantic musical films
Films about singers
Films set in Mumbai
Films shot in Mumbai